The International Brigades were military units set up by the Communist International to assist the Popular Front government of the Second Spanish Republic during the Spanish Civil War. The organization existed for two years, from 1936 until 1938. It is estimated that during the entire war, between 40,000 and 59,000 members served in the International Brigades, including some 10,000 who died in combat. Beyond the Spanish Civil War, "International Brigades" is also sometimes used interchangeably with the term foreign legion in reference to military units comprising foreigners who volunteer to fight in the military of another state, often in times of war.

The headquarters of the brigade was located at the Gran Hotel, Albacete, Castilla-La Mancha. They participated in the battles of Madrid, Jarama, Guadalajara, Brunete, Belchite, Teruel, Aragon and the Ebro. Most of these ended in defeat. For the last year of its existence, the International Brigades were integrated into the Spanish Republican Army as part of the Spanish Foreign Legion. The organisation was dissolved on 23 September 1938 by Spanish Prime Minister Juan Negrín in a vain attempt to get more support from the liberal democracies on the Non-Intervention Committee.

The International Brigades were strongly supported by the Comintern and represented the Soviet Union's commitment to assisting the Spanish Republic (with arms, logistics, military advisers and the NKVD), just as Portugal, Fascist Italy, and Nazi Germany were assisting the opposing Nationalist insurgency. The largest number of volunteers came from France (where the French Communist Party had many members) and communist exiles from Italy and Germany. Many Jews were part of the brigades, being particularly numerous within the volunteers coming from the United States, Poland, France, England and Argentina.

Republican volunteers who were opposed to Stalinism did not join the Brigades but instead enlisted in the separate Popular Front, the POUM (formed from Trotskyist, Bukharinist, and other anti-Stalinist groups, which did not separate Spaniards and foreign volunteers), or anarcho-syndicalist groups such as the Durruti Column, the IWA, and the CNT.

Formation and recruitment

Using foreign communist parties to recruit volunteers for Spain was first proposed in the Soviet Union in September 1936—apparently at the suggestion of Maurice Thorez—by Willi Münzenberg, chief of Comintern propaganda for Western Europe. As a security measure, non-communist volunteers would first be interviewed by an NKVD agent.

By the end of September, the Italian and French Communist Parties had decided to set up a column. Luigi Longo, ex-leader of the Italian Communist Youth, was charged to make the necessary arrangements with the Spanish government. The Soviet Ministry of Defense also helped, since they had an experience of dealing with corps of international volunteers during the Russian Civil War. The idea was initially opposed by Largo Caballero, but after the first setbacks of the war, he changed his mind and finally agreed to the operation on 22 October. However, the Soviet Union did not withdraw from the Non-Intervention Committee, probably to avoid diplomatic conflict with France and the United Kingdom.

The main recruitment center was in Paris, under the supervision of Soviet colonel Karol "Walter" Świerczewski. On 17 October 1936, an open letter by Joseph Stalin to José Díaz was published in Mundo Obrero, arguing that victory for the Spanish second republic was a matter not only for Spaniards but also for the whole of "progressive humanity"; in short order, communist activists joined with moderate socialist and liberal groups to form anti-fascist "popular front" militias in several countries, most of them under the control of or influenced by the Comintern.

Entry to Spain was arranged for volunteers, for instance, a Yugoslav, Josip Broz, who would become famous as Marshal Tito, was in Paris to provide assistance, money, and passports for volunteers from Eastern Europe (including numerous Yugoslav volunteers in the Spanish Civil War). Volunteers were sent by train or ship from France to Spain, and sent to the base at Albacete. Many of them also went by themselves to Spain. The volunteers were under no contract, nor defined engagement period, which would later prove a problem.

Also, many Italians, Germans, and people from other countries joined the movement, with the idea that combat in Spain was the first step to restore democracy or advance a revolutionary cause in their own country. There were also many unemployed workers (especially from France), and adventurers. Finally, some 500 communists who had been exiled to Russia were sent to Spain (among them, experienced military leaders from the First World War like "Kléber" Stern, "Gomez" Zaisser, "Lukacs" Zalka and "Gal" Galicz, who would prove invaluable in combat).

The operation was met with enthusiasm by communists, but by anarchists with skepticism, at best. At first, the anarchists, who controlled the borders with France, were told to refuse communist volunteers, but reluctantly allowed their passage after protests. Keith Scott Watson, a journalist who fought alongside Esmond Romilly at Cerro de los Ángeles and who later “resigned” from the Thälmann Battalion, describes in his memoirs how he was detained and interrogated by Anarchist border guards before eventually being allowed into the country. A group of 500 volunteers (mainly French, with a few exiled Poles and Germans) arrived in Albacete on 14 October 1936. They were met by international volunteers who had already been fighting in Spain: Germans from the Thälmann Battalion, Italians from the Centuria Gastone Sozzi and French from the Commune de Paris Battalion. Among them was the poet John Cornford, who had travelled down through France and Spain with a group of fellow intellectuals and artists including John Sommerfield, Bernard Knox and Jan Kurzke, all of whom left detailed memoirs of their battle experiences.

On 30 May 1937, the Spanish liner Ciudad de Barcelona, carrying 200–250 volunteers from Marseille to Spain, was torpedoed by a Nationalist submarine off the coast of Malgrat de Mar. The ship sunk and up to 65 volunteers are estimated to have drowned.

Albacete soon became the International Brigades headquarters and its main depot. It was run by a troika of Comintern heavyweights: André Marty was commander; Luigi Longo (Gallo) was Inspector-General; and Giuseppe Di Vittorio (Nicoletti) was chief political commissar.

There were many Jewish volunteers amongst the brigaders - about a quarter of the total. A Jewish company was formed within the Polish battalion that was named after Naftali Botwin, a young Jewish communist killed in Poland in 1925.

The French Communist Party provided uniforms for the Brigades. They were organized into mixed brigades, the basic military unit of the Republican People's Army. Discipline was severe. For several weeks, the Brigades were locked in their base while their strict military training was underway.

Service

First engagements: Siege of Madrid

The Battle of Madrid was a major success for the Republic, and staved off the prospect of a rapid defeat at the hands of Francisco Franco's forces. The role of the International Brigades in this victory was generally recognized but was exaggerated by Comintern propaganda so that the outside world heard only of their victories and not those of Spanish units. So successful was such propaganda that the British Ambassador, Sir Henry Chilton, declared that there were no Spaniards in the army which had defended Madrid. The International Brigade forces that fought in Madrid arrived after another successful Republican fighting. Of the 40,000 Republican troops in the city, the foreign troops numbered less than 3,000.

Even though the International Brigades did not win the battle by themselves, nor significantly change the situation, they certainly did provide an example by their determined fighting and improved the morale of the population by demonstrating the concern of other nations in the fight. Many of the older members of the International Brigades provided valuable combat experience, having fought during the First World War (Spain remained neutral in 1914–1918) and the Irish War of Independence (some had fought in the British Army while others had fought in the Irish Republican Army (IRA)).

One of the strategic positions in Madrid was the Casa de Campo. There the Nationalist troops were Moroccans, commanded by General José Enrique Varela. They were stopped by III and IV Brigades of the Spanish Republican Army.

On 9 November 1936, the XI International Brigade – comprising 1,900 men from the Edgar André Battalion, the Commune de Paris Battalion and the Dabrowski Battalion, together with a British machine-gun company — took up position at the Casa de Campo. In the evening, its commander, General Kléber, launched an assault on the Nationalist positions. This lasted for the whole night and part of the next morning. At the end of the fight, the Nationalist troops had been forced to retreat, abandoning all hopes of a direct assault on Madrid by Casa de Campo, while the XIth Brigade had lost a third of its personnel.

On 13 November, the 1,550-man strong XII International Brigade, made up of the Thälmann Battalion, the Garibaldi Battalion and the André Marty Battalion, deployed. Commanded by General "Lukacs", they assaulted Nationalist positions on the high ground of Cerro de Los Angeles. As a result of language and communication problems, command issues, lack of rest, poor coordination with armored units, and insufficient artillery support, the attack failed.

On 19 November, the anarchist militias were forced to retreat, and Nationalist troops — Moroccans and Spanish Foreign Legionnaires, covered by the Nazi Condor Legion — captured a foothold in the University City. The 11th Brigade was sent to drive the Nationalists out of the University City. The battle was extremely bloody, a mix of artillery and aerial bombardment, with bayonet and grenade fights, room by room. Anarchist leader Buenaventura Durruti was shot there on 19 November 1936 and died the next day. The battle in the university went on until three-quarters of the University City was under Nationalist control. Both sides then started setting up trenches and fortifications. It was then clear that any assault from either side would be far too costly; the Nationalist leaders had to renounce the idea of a direct assault on Madrid, and prepare for a siege of the capital.

On 13 December 1936, 18,000 nationalist troops attempted an attack to close the encirclement of Madrid at Guadarrama — an engagement known as the Battle of the Corunna Road. The Republicans sent in a Soviet armored unit, under General Dmitry Pavlov, and both XI and XII International Brigades. Violent combat followed, and they stopped the Nationalist advance.

An attack was then launched by the Republic on the Córdoba front. The battle ended in a form of stalemate; a communique was issued, saying: "During the day the advance continued without the loss of any territory." Poets Ralph Winston Fox and John Cornford were killed. Eventually, the Nationalists advanced, taking the hydroelectric station at El Campo. André Marty accused the commander of the Marseillaise Battalion, Gaston Delasalle, of espionage and treason and had him executed. (It is doubtful that Delasalle would have been a spy for Francisco Franco; he was denounced by his second-in-command, André Heussler, who was subsequently executed for treason during World War II by the French Resistance.)

Further Nationalist attempts after Christmas to encircle Madrid met with failure, but not without extremely violent combat. On 6 January 1937, the Thälmann Battalion arrived at Las Rozas, and held its positions until it was destroyed as a fighting force. On 9 January, only 10  km had been lost to the Nationalists, when the XIII International Brigade and XIV International Brigade and the 1st British Company, arrived in Madrid. Violent Republican assaults were launched in an attempt to retake the land, with little success. On 15 January, trenches and fortifications were built by both sides, resulting in a stalemate.

The Nationalists did not take Madrid until the very end of the war, in March 1939, when they marched in unopposed. There were some pockets of resistance during the subsequent months.

Battle of Jarama
On 6 February 1937, following the fall of Málaga, the nationalists launched an attack on the Madrid–Andalusia road, south of Madrid. The Nationalists quickly advanced on the little town of Ciempozuelos, held by the XV International Brigade. was composed of the British Battalion (British Commonwealth and Irish), the Dimitrov Battalion (miscellaneous Balkan nationalities), the Sixth February Battalion (Belgians and French), the Canadian Mackenzie-Papineau Battalion and the Abraham Lincoln Brigade. An independent 80-men-strong (mainly) Irish unit, known afterward as the Connolly Column, also fought. Battalions were rarely composed entirely of one nationality, rather they were, for the most part, a mix of many.

On 11 February 1937, a Nationalist brigade launched a surprise attack on the André Marty Battalion (XIV International Brigade), killing its sentries silently and crossing the Jarama. The Garibaldi Battalion stopped the advance with heavy fire. At another point, the same tactic allowed the Nationalists to move their troops across the river. On 12 February, the British Battalion, XV International Brigade took the brunt of the attack, remaining under heavy fire for seven hours. The position became known as "Suicide Hill". At the end of the day, only 225 of the 600 members of the British battalion remained. One company was captured by ruse, when Nationalists advanced among their ranks singing The Internationale.

On 17 February, the Republican Army counter-attacked. On 23 and 27 February, the International Brigades were engaged, but with little success. The Lincoln Battalion was put under great pressure, with no artillery support. It suffered 120 killed and 175 wounded. Amongst the dead was the Irish poet Charles Donnelly and Leo Greene.

There were heavy casualties on both sides, and although "both claimed victory ... both suffered defeats". The battle resulted in a stalemate, with both sides digging in and creating elaborate trench systems. On 22 February 1937, the League of Nations Non-Intervention Committee ban on foreign volunteers went into effect.

Battle of Guadalajara

After the failed assault on the Jarama, the Nationalists attempted another assault on Madrid, this time from the northeast. The objective was the town of Guadalajara, 50  km from Madrid. The whole Italian expeditionary corps — 35,000 men, with 80 battle tanks and 200 field artillery — was deployed, as Benito Mussolini wanted the victory to be credited to Italy. On 9 March 1937, the Italians made a breach in the Republican lines but did not properly exploit the advance. However, the rest of the Nationalist army was advancing, and the situation appeared critical for the Republicans. A formation drawn from the best available units of the Republican army, including the XI and XII International Brigades, was quickly assembled.

At dawn on 10 March, the Nationalists closed in, and by noon, the Garibaldi Battalion counterattacked. Some confusion arose from the fact that the sides were not aware of each other's movements, and that both sides spoke Italian; this resulted in scouts from both sides exchanging information without realizing they were enemies. The Republican lines advanced and made contact with XI International Brigade. Nationalist tanks were shot at and infantry patrols came into action.

On 11 March, the Nationalist army broke the front of the Republican army. The Thälmann Battalion suffered heavy losses, but succeeded in holding the Trijueque–Torija road. The Garibaldi also held its positions. On 12 March, Republican planes and tanks attacked. The Thälmann Battalion attacked Trijuete in a bayonet charge and re-took the town, capturing numerous prisoners.

Other battles
The International Brigades also saw combat in the Battle of Teruel in January 1938. The 35th International Division suffered heavily in this battle from aerial bombardment as well as shortages of food, winter clothing, and ammunition. The XIV International Brigade fought in the Battle of Ebro in July 1938, the last Republican offensive of the war.

Casualties
Existing primary sources provide conflicting information as to the number of brigadiers killed; a report of the IB Albacete staff from late March 1938 claimed 4,575 KIA, an internal Soviet communication to Moscow by an NKVD major Semyon Gnadin from late July 1938 claimed 3,615 KIA, while the prime minister Juan Negrín in his farewell address in Barcelona of October 28, 1938 mentioned 5,000 fallen.

Also in historiography there is no agreement as to fatal casualties. One exact figures offered is 9,934; it was calculated in the mid-1970s and is at times repeated until today. The highest estimate identified is 15,000 KIA. Many scholars prefer 10,000, also in recently published works. The popular Osprey series claims there were at least 7,800 killed. However, other authors provide estimates that point rather to the range from 6,100 to 6,500. In some non-scholarly publications the number is given as 4,900. The above figures include brigadiers killed in action, these who died of wounds later or those who were executed as POWs. They do not include brigadiers who were executed by their own side, the figure that some claim might have been 500; they also do not include victims of accidents (self-shooting, traffic, drownings etc) or these who perished due to health problems (illness, frostbiten, poisoning etc).

The total number of casualties is given as 48,909. It includes killed, missing and wounded, though probably contains numerous duplicated cases, as one individual might have suffered wounds a few times.

The ratio of KIA to all IB combatants as calculated by historians might differ even more as it depends not only on estimates as to the number of killed, but also on estimates as to the total number of volunteers. Some sources suggest the figure of 8.3%, some authors claim 15%, others opt for 16.7% or endorse the ratio of 28.6%; a single author arrived even at 33%. In comparison, in shock units used by the Nationalists, though they were not entirely comparable, the ratio was 11.3% for the Carlist requetés and 14.6% for the Moroccan regulares. The overall percentage of killed in action in armies of both sides is estimated at some 7%.

Estimates of KIA ratio for major national contingents differ enormously and often bear no reasonable relation to the overall KIA ratio, calculated for the Brigades. For the French (including French-speaking Belgians and Swiss) the figures range between 12% and 18%; for the Germans (including Austrians and German-speaking Swiss) between 22% and 40% for the Poles (including Ukrainians, Jews, Belorussians) between 30% and 62%, for the Italians between 18% and 20%, for the Americans between 13% and 32%, for the Yugoslavs between 35% and 50%, for the British between 16% and 22% and for the Canadians between 43% and 57%.

Disbandment

In October 1938, at the height of the Battle of the Ebro, the Non-Intervention Committee demanded the withdrawal of the International Brigades. The Republican government of Juan Negrín announced the decision in the League of Nations on 21 September 1938. The disbandment was part of an ill-advised effort to get the Nationalists' foreign backers to withdraw their troops and to persuade the Western democracies such as France and Britain to end their arms embargo on the Republic.

By this time there were about an estimated 10,000 foreign volunteers still serving in Spain for the Republican side, and about 50,000 foreign conscripts for the Nationalists (excluding another 30,000 Moroccans). Perhaps half of the International Brigadistas were exiles or refugees from Nazi Germany, Fascist Italy or other countries, such as Hungary, which had authoritarian right-wing governments at the time. These men could not safely return home and some were instead given honorary Spanish citizenship and integrated into Spanish units of the Popular Army. The remainder were repatriated to their own countries. The Belgian and Dutch volunteers lost their citizenship because they had served in a foreign army.

Composition

Overview

The first brigades were composed mostly of French, Belgian, Italian, and German volunteers, backed by a sizeable contingent of Polish miners from Northern France and Belgium. The XIth, XIIth and XIIIth were the first brigades formed. Later, the XIVth and XVth Brigades were raised, mixing experienced soldiers with new volunteers. Smaller Brigades — the 86th, 129th and 150th - were formed in late 1937 and 1938, mostly for temporary tactical reasons.

About 32,000 foreigners volunteered to defend the Spanish Republic, the vast majority of them with the International Brigades. Many were veterans of World War I. Their early engagements in 1936 during the Siege of Madrid amply demonstrated their military and propaganda value.

The international volunteers were mainly socialists, communists, or others willing to accept communist authority, and a high proportion were Jewish. Some were involved in the Barcelona May Days fighting against leftist opponents of the Communists: the Workers' Party of Marxist Unification (POUM) (Partido Obrero de Unificación Marxista, an anti-Stalinist Marxist party) and the anarchist CNT (CNT, Confederación Nacional del Trabajo) and FAI (FAI, Iberian Anarchist Federation), who had strong support in Catalonia. These libertarian groups attracted fewer foreign volunteers.

To simplify communication, the battalions usually concentrated on people of the same nationality or language group. The battalions were often (formally, at least) named after inspirational people or events. From spring 1937 onwards, many battalions contained one Spanish volunteer company of about 150 men.

Later in the war, military discipline tightened and learning Spanish became mandatory. By decree of 23 September 1937, the International Brigades formally became units of the Spanish Foreign Legion. This made them subject to the Spanish Code of Military Justice. However, the Spanish Foreign Legion itself sided with the Nationalists throughout the coup and the civil war. The same decree also specified that non-Spanish officers in the Brigades should not exceed Spanish ones by more than 50 percent.

Non-Spanish battalions

 Abraham Lincoln Battalion – from the United States and Canada, with some British, Cypriots, and Chileans from the Chilean Worker Club of New York.
 Connolly Column – a mostly Irish republican group who fought as a section of the Lincoln Battalion.
 Mickiewicz Battalion – predominantly Polish.
 André Marty Battalion – predominantly French and Belgian. 
 British Battalion – mainly British but with many from Australia, New Zealand, South Africa, Cyprus and other Commonwealth countries.
 Checo-Balcánico Battalion – Czechoslovakian and Balkan.
 Commune de Paris Battalion – predominantly French.
 Deba Blagoiev Battalion – predominantly Bulgarian, later merged into the Đaković Battalion.
 Dimitrov Battalion – Greek, Yugoslav, Bulgarian, Czechoslovakian, Hungarian and Romanian (named after Georgi Dimitrov).
 Đuro Đaković Battalion – Yugoslav, Bulgarian, anarchist, named for former Yugoslav Communist Party secretary Djuro Đaković.
 Dabrowski Battalion – mostly Polish and Hungarian, also Czechoslovak, Ukrainian, Bulgarian and Palestinian Jews.
 Edgar André Battalion – mostly German, also Austrian, Yugoslav, Bulgarian, Albanian, Romanian, Danish, Swedish, Norwegian and Dutch.
 Español Battalion – Mexican, Cuban, Puerto Rican, Chilean, Argentine and Bolivian.
 Figlio Battalion – mostly Italian; later merged with the Garibaldi Battalion.
 Garibaldi Battalion – raised as the Italoespañol Battalion and renamed. Mostly Italian and Spanish, but contained some Albanians.
 George Washington Battalion – the second U.S. battalion. Later merged with the Lincoln Battalion, to form the Lincoln-Washington Battalion.
 Hans Beimler Battalion – mostly German; later merged with the Thälmann Battalion.
 Henri Barbusse Battalion – predominantly French.
 Henri Vuilleman Battalion – predominantly French.
  (Matteotti Battalion) – predominantly Italian and the first international group to reach Spain.
 Louise Michel Battalions – French-speaking, later merged with the Henri Vuillemin Battalion.
 Mackenzie–Papineau Battalion – the "Mac-Paps", predominantly Canadian.
 Marseillaise Battalion – predominantly French, commanded by George Nathan.
 Incorporated one separate British company.
 Palafox Battalion – Yugoslav, Polish, Czechoslovakian, Hungarian, Jewish and French.
 Naftali Botwin Company – a Jewish unit formed within the Palafox Battalion in December 1937.
 Pierre Brachet Battalion – mostly French.
 Rakosi Battalion – mainly Hungarian, also Czechoslovaks, Ukrainians, Poles, Chinese, Mongolians and Palestinian Jews.
 Nine Nations Battalion (also known as the Sans nons and Neuf Nationalités) – French, Belgian, Italian, German, Austrian, Dutch, Danish, Swiss and Polish.
 Sixth of February Battalion – French, Belgian, Moroccan, Algerian, Libyan, Syrian, Iranian, Iraqi, Egyptian, Chinese, Japanese, Indian, Filipino and Palestinian Jewish.
 Thälmann Battalion – predominantly German, named after German communist leader Ernst Thälmann.
 Tom Mann Centuria – a small, mostly British, group who operated as a section of the Thälmann Battalion.
 Thomas Masaryk Battalion: mostly Czechoslovak.
 Chapaev Battalion – composed of 21 nationalities (Ukrainian, Polish, Czechoslovakian, Bulgarian, Yugoslavian, Turkish, Italian, German, Austrian, Finnish, Swedish, Norwegian, Danish, Belgian, French, Greek, Albanian, Dutch, Swiss, Lithuanian and Estonian).
 Vaillant-Couturier Battalion – French, Belgian, Czechoslovakian, Bulgarian, Swedish, Norwegian and Danish.
 Veinte Battalion – American, British, Italian, Yugoslav and Bulgarian.
 Zwölfte Februar Battalion – mostly Austrian.
 Company De Zeven Provinciën – Dutch.

Brigadistas by country of origin
{| class="wikitable"
|-
!width=16%| Country !!width=16%| Estimate !!width=68%| Notes
|-
|  France ||8,962–9,000 ||
|-
|  Italy || 3,000–3,350 ||
|-
|  Germany
| rowspan="2" | 3,000–5,000 Beevor quotes 2,217 Germans and 872 Austrians. ||
|-
| Austria
|Austrian Resistance documents name 1,400 Austrians. Annexed in 1938 by Germany.
|-
|  Poland || 500–5,000 || International historiography tends to hover around the figure of 3,000 "Poles". It includes migrants from Poland but recruited in France and Belgium, who made up some 75% of the Polish contingent; it also includes volunteers of Belorussian, Ukrainian and especially Jewish origin; the latter might have accounted for 45% of all volunteers classified as "Poles"
|-
| ||2,341–2,800 ||
|-
|  Yugoslavia
| 1,500–2,095 ||
|-
| || 2,500–4,700 
||
|-
| || 1,600–1,722 ||
|-
| || 1,546–2,000 ||Thomas estimates 1,000.
|-
|  Cuba|| 1,101 ||
|-
|  Czechoslovakia || 1,006–1,500 ||
|-
| ||740 ||
|-
|  ||628–691||
|-
|  ||550 || 220 died.
|-
|  Hungary ||528–1,500 ||
|-
| ||500 || Est. 799–1,000 from Scandinavia (of whom 500 were Swedes.)
|-
|  Romania || 500 ||
|-
|  Bulgaria ||462 ||
|-
| ||408–800 ||
|-
| 
|300–600
|
|-
|  Ireland || 250 || Split between the British Battalion and the Lincoln Battalion which included the famed Connolly Column
|-
| ||225 || 100 died.
|-
| || 225 || Including 78 Finnish Americans and 73 Finnish Canadians, ca. 70 died.
|-
|  Estonia ||200 ||
|-
|  Greece || 290–400 ||
|-
|  Portugal || 134|| Due to the geographic and linguistic proximity most Portuguese volunteers joined the Republican forces directly and not the International Brigades (such is the case of Emídio Guerreiro and that was the plan of the failed 1936 Naval Revolt). At the time it was estimated that about 2,000 Portuguese fought on the Republican side, spread throughout different units.
|-
|  ||103 || Livre historiographic d'Henri Wehenkel – D'Spueniekämfer (1997)
|-
|  China || 100||Organised by the Chinese Communist Party, members were mostly overseas Chinese led by Xie Weijin.
|-
| ||90 ||
|-
|  Cyprus ||60 ||
|-
|  || 60 || Of whom 16 killed.
|-
|  Philippines || 50 ||
|-
|  Albania || 43 || Organised in the "Garibaldi Battalion" together with Italians. They were led by the Kosovar revolutionary Asim Vokshi
|-
|  || 24 ||
|-
|  New Zealand || "Perhaps 20" || Mixed into British units
|-
| Others || 1,122||
|}

Status after the war

After the Civil War was eventually won by the Nationalists, the brigaders were initially on the "wrong side" of history, especially as most of their home countries had right-wing governments (in France, for instance, the Popular Front was not in power anymore).

However, since most of these countries soon found themselves at war with the very powers which had been supporting the Nationalists, the brigadistas gained some prestige as the first guard of the democracies, as having foreseen the danger of fascism and gone to fight it. Retrospectively, it was clear that the war in Spain was as much a precursor of the Second World War as a Spanish civil war.

Some glory therefore accrued to the volunteers (a great many of the survivors also fought during World War II), but this soon faded in the fear that it would promote communism by association.

An exception is among some left-wingers, for example many anarchists. Among these, the Brigades, or at least their leadership, are criticized for their role in suppressing the Spanish Revolution. An example of a modern work that promotes this view is Ken Loach's film Land and Freedom. A well-known contemporary account of the Spanish Civil War which also takes this view is George Orwell's book Homage to Catalonia.

East Germany
Germany was undivided until after the Second World War. At that time, the new communist state, the German Democratic Republic, began to create a national identity which was separate from and antithetical to the former Nazi Germany. The Spanish Civil War, and especially the role of the International Brigades, became a substantial part of East Germany's memorial rituals because of the substantial numbers of German communists who had served in the brigades. These showcased a commitment by many Germans to antifascism at a time when Germany and Nazism were often conflated.

Canada
Survivors of the Mackenzie-Papineau Battalion were often investigated by the Royal Canadian Mounted Police and denied employment when they returned to Canada. Some were prevented from serving in the military during the Second World War due to "political unreliability".

In 1995 a monument to veterans of the war was built near Ontario's provincial parliament. On 12 February 2000, a bronze statue "The Spirit of the Republic" by sculptor Jack Harman, based on an original poster from the Spanish Republic, was placed on the grounds of the British Columbia Legislature. In 2001, the few remaining Canadian veterans of the Spanish Civil War dedicated a monument to Canadian members of the International Brigades in Ottawa's Green Island Park.

Poland

In line with the 1920 legislation, Polish citizens who volunteered to the IB were automatically stripped of citizenship as individuals who without formal approval served in foreign armed forces.  Following republican defeat the combatants recruited in France and Belgium returned there. Among the others some served in pro-Communist partisan units in the German-occupied Poland and some made it to the USSR and served in the pro-Communist Polish army raised there.

In the Communist Poland the IB combatants – referred to as "Dąbrowszczacy" - were granted veteran rights, but their fate differed depending upon political circumstances. Following some early exaltation in 1945-1949 they were later approached somewhat cautiously. There were cases of assuming high positions in administration and especially in security, but there were also cases of deposition, arrest and prison on trumped-up charges of political conspiracy; these were released in the mid-1950s.

Though from the onset Polish engagement in IB was hailed as "working class taking to arms against Fascism", the most intense idolization took place between the mid-1950s and the mid-1960s, with a spate of publications, schools and streets named after "Dąbrowszczacy". However, anti-Semitic turn of the late 1960s again produced de-emphasizing of IB volunteers, many of whom left Poland. Until the end of Communist rule the IB episode was duly acknowledged, but propaganda related was a far cry from veneration reserved for wartime Communist partisans or the USSR-raised Polish army. Despite some efforts on part of IB combatants, no monument has been erected.

After 1989 it was unclear whether Dąbrowszczacy were furtherly entitled to veteran privileges; the issue generated political debates until they became pointless, as almost all IB combatants had passed away. Another question was about homage references, existent in public space. A state-run institution IPN declared Polish IB combatants in service of the Stalinist regime and related homage references subject to de-communisation legislation. However, efficiency of purges of public space differs depending upon local political configuration and occasionally there is heated public debate ensuing. Until today the role of Polish IB combatants remains a highly divisive topic; for some they are traitors and for some they are heroes.

Switzerland

In Switzerland, public sympathy was high for the Republican cause, but the federal government banned all fundraising and recruiting activities a month after the start of the war as part of the country's long-standing policy of neutrality. Around 800 Swiss volunteers joined the International Brigades, among them a small number of women. Sixty percent of Swiss volunteers identified as communists, while the others included socialists, anarchists and antifascists.

Some 170 Swiss volunteers were killed in the war. The survivors were tried by military courts upon their return to Switzerland for violating the criminal prohibition on foreign military service. The courts pronounced 420 sentences which ranged from around 2 weeks to 4 years in prison, and often also stripped the convicts of their political rights for the period of up to 5 years. In the Swiss society, traditionally highly appreciative of civic virtues, this translated to longtime stigmatization also after the penalty period expired. In the judgment of Swiss historian Mauro Cerutti, volunteers were punished more harshly in Switzerland than in any other democratic country.

Motions to pardon the Swiss brigaders on the account that they fought for a just cause have been repeatedly introduced in the Swiss federal parliament. A first such proposal was defeated in 1939 on neutrality grounds. In 2002, Parliament again rejected a pardon of the Swiss war volunteers, with a majority arguing that they broke a law that remains in effect to this day. In March 2009, Parliament adopted the third bill of pardon, retroactively rehabilitating Swiss brigades, only a handful of whom were still alive. In 2000 there was a monument honoring Swiss IB combatants unveiled in Geneva; there are also numerous plaques mounted elsewhere, e.g. at the Volkshaus in Zürich.

United Kingdom
On disbandment, 305 British volunteers left Spain to return home. They arrived at Victoria Station in central London on 7 December and were met warmly as returning heroes by a crowd of supporters including Clement Attlee, Stafford Cripps, Willie Gallacher, and Will Lawther.

The last surviving British member of the International Brigades, Geoffrey Servante, died in April 2019 aged 99.

United States

In the United States, the returned volunteers were labeled "premature anti-fascists" by the FBI, denied promotion during service in the U.S. military during World War II, and pursued by Congressional committees during the Red Scare of 1947–1957. However, threats of loss of citizenship were not carried out.

Recognition
Josep Almudéver, believed to be the last surviving veteran of the International Brigades, died on 23 May 2021 at the age of 101. Although born into a Spanish family and living in Spain at the outbreak of the conflict, he also held French citizenship and enlisted in the International Brigades to avoid age restrictions in the Spanish Republican army. He served in the CXXIX International Brigade and later fought in the Spanish Maquis, and after the  war lived in exile in France.

Spain
On 26 January 1996, the Spanish government gave Spanish citizenship to the 600 or so remaining Brigadistas, fulfilling a promise made by Prime Minister Juan Negrín in 1938.

France
In 1996, Jacques Chirac, then French President, granted the former French members of the International Brigades the legal status of former service personnel ("ancient combatants") following the request of two French communist Members of Parliament, Lefort and Asensi, both children of volunteers. Before 1996, the same request was turned down several times including by François Mitterrand, the former Socialist President.

Symbolism and heraldry
The International Brigades were inheritors of a socialist aesthetic. The flags featured the colors of the Spanish Republic: red, yellow and purple, often along with socialist symbols (red flags, hammer and sickle, fist). The emblem of the brigades themselves was the three-pointed red star, which is often featured.

See also
 Foreign involvement in the Spanish Civil War
 International Legion of Territorial Defense of Ukraine
 International Freedom Battalion

References

Footnotes

Sources 

 Alvarez, Santiago.  Historia politica y militar de las brigadas internacionales Madrid: Compañía Literaria, 1996.
 Anderson, James W. The Spanish Civil War: A History and Reference Guide. Santa Barbara: Greenwood Press, 2003. 
 
 Beevor, Antony. [1982] The Spanish Civil War. Reissued London: Weidenfeld & Nicolson (Cassell), 1999. 
 Beevor, Antony. (2006). The Battle for Spain: The Spanish Civil War 1936–1939. London: Weidenfeld & Nicolson, 2006. 
 Bradley, Ken. International Brigades in Spain 1936-39 with Mike Chappell (Illustrator) Published by Elite. .
 Brome, Vincent. The International Brigades: Spain 1936–1939. London: Heinemann, 1965.
 Castells, Andreu.  Las brigadas internacionales en la guerra de España. Barcelona: Editorial Ariel, 1974.
 Copeman, Fred (1948). Reason in Revolt. London: Blandford Press, 1948.
 Eby, Cecil. Comrades and Commissars. Pennsylvania: Penn State University Press, 2007. 
 Gurney, Jason (1974) Crusade in Spain. London: Faber, 1974. 
 Kantorowicz, Alfred (1938, 1948), Spanisches Tagebuch, Madrid (1938), Berlin (1948).
 Kuuli, O; Riis, V; Utt, O; (editors) (1965)  Hispaania tules. Mälestusi ja dokumente fašismivastasest võitlusest Hispaanias 1936.-1939. aastal. Tallinn: Eesti raamat.
 Lefebvre, Michel; Skoutelsky, Rémi.  Las brigadas internacionales. Barcelona: Lunwerg Editores (2003). 
 Marco, Jorge and Thomas, Maria, "'Mucho malo for fascisti': Languages and Transnational Soldiers in the Spanish Civil War", War & Society, 38-2 (2019)
 Marco, Jorge, "The Antifascist Tower of Babel: Language Barriers in Civil-War Spain", The Volunteer, December (2019) 
 Marco, Jorge, "Transnational Soldiers and Guerrilla Warfare from the Spanish Civil War to the Second World War", War i History (2018)
 Marco, Jorge and Anderson, Peter, "Legitimacy by proxy:searching for a usable past through the International Brigades in Spain’s Post-Franco democracy, 1975-2015", Journal of Modern European History, 14-3 (2016) 
 Orwell, George. [1938] A Homage to Catalonia. London: Penguin Books, 1969. (New edition) 
 Thomas, Hugh. (1961) The Spanish Civil War. London: Eyre & Spottiswoode, 1961.
 Thomas, Hugh. (2003) The Spanish Civil War, 2003. London: Penguin (Revised 4th edition), 2003. 
 Giles Tremlett. (2020) The International Brigades: Fascism, Freedom and the Spanish Civil War, Bloomsbury, 2020 
 Wainwright, John, L. (2011) The Last to Fall: the Life and Letters of Ivor Hickman - an International Brigader in Spain. Southampton: Hatchet Green Publishing.

External links 

 IBMT the international brigade memorial trust
 Abraham Lincoln Brigade Archives
 Private Collection about German Exile and Spanish Civil War
 Remembering the Sussex Brigaders

 
Armed Forces of the Second Spanish Republic
Expatriate military units and formations
Foreign volunteers in the Spanish Civil War
Military units and formations disestablished in 1938
Military units and formations established in 1936